Shulman is a psybient group from Israel, with members Yaniv Shulman and Omri Harpaz. Shulman's sound features elements of "glitch" and displays a large IDM influence. Shulman is also a remix artist within the psybient genre.

The duo has toured many psytrance venues and festivals, visiting a number of countries including Bulgaria, Mexico, Portugal, and Kenya.

Discography

Studio releases
Soundscapes and Modern Tales (Shaffel Records 2002)
In Search of a Meaningful Moment (Aleph Zero Records 2003)
Random Thoughts (Aleph Zero Records 2006)
Endless Rhythms of the Beatless Heart (Aleph Zero Records 2007)
ALive (Aleph Zero Records 2012)

Contributions
luminus, hypnotica (Hom-mega Productions 2000)
California Sunshine, Flying Eye Land (MDMA Records 2000)
California Sunshine, Wonderland (phonokol 2000)
Omar Faruk Tekbilek and Steve Shehan, Natural Born Chillers (Aleph Zero Records 2004)
Remix, Ya Bouy
sub6 feat. Michele Adamson, Ra He' Ya (Hom-mega Productions 2004)
Remix, Ra He' Ya

Shulman in the media

Digitally Imported
Shulman is frequently featured on the popular internet radio station, Digitally Imported. On February 20, 2006, at 11:00 AM CST, the Digitally Imported chillout channel streamed Random Thoughts, Shulman's third studio release, for the entire internet community to hear.

Yaniv Shulman
According to the website, Yaniv Shulman, the duo frontman, is a chillout artist from Israel, who studied computer science. Known for his participation in and founding of the music group, Yaniv Shulman is also cofounder of Aleph Zero Records.

Admired musicians
According to the official Shulman website, Shulman holds the following musicians in high esteem:
FSOL
Pink Floyd
Hallucinogen
Björk
Antipop Consortium
Meshuggah

External links
 shulman.info
 Aleph Zero Records
 Digitally Imported

Israeli electronic music groups
Israeli musical duos
Ambient music groups
Downtempo musicians